The broad-templed calyptotis (Calyptotis temporalis)  is a species of skink found in Queensland in Australia.

References

Calyptotis
Reptiles described in 1983
Taxa named by Allen Eddy Greer